The Rappahannock River is a river of the Tasman Region of New Zealand's South Island. It flows predominantly north from its sources east of Maruia, reaching the Warwick River five kilometres from the latter's outflow into the Maruia River.

See also
List of rivers of New Zealand

References

Rivers of the Tasman District
Rivers of New Zealand